Celastrina serotina, the cherry gall azure, is a butterfly of the family Lycaenidae. It is found across North America as far north as the treeline. Its flight time is between mid-May and mid-June in eastern Ontario after the spring azure and before the summer azure.  The larva has been reported to feed on galls of eriophyid mites (e. g. Eriophyes cerasicrumena) and apparently also on the mites themselves, making them one of the rare species of carnivorous Lepidoptera. It is commonly found around woodland roads of upland mixed deciduous hardwood forests which are surrounded by wetlands.

Similar species
Spring azure (C. ladon)
Summer azure (C. neglecta)
Holly azure (C. idella)
Lucia azure (C. lucia)

References

External links
Cherry gall azure, BugGuide.net

Celastrina
Butterflies of North America
Butterflies described in 2005